Maren Juel (18 March 1749 – 20 February 1815) was a Norwegian landowner, regarded as the wealthiest woman in Norway at her time.

She was born in Christiania (now Oslo) as the daughter of timber trader and civil servant Hans Juel (1702–1765). She was the sister of timber trader, Jacob Juel. In 1771 she was married to businessman and landowner Peder Holter (1723 - 1786). He had accumulated a number of estates and was regarded for his time to be one of the most wealthy men in the country. After her husband's death in 1786, she managed the properties herself. These included Losby in  Lørenskog as well as the estates Hafslund and  Borregaard in Sarpsborg  and the Ljan Estate (Ljansbruket)  which included Stubljan in Nordstrand and  Hvitebjørn in Oppegård.

In 1791 she married civil servant Ole Christopher Wessel who died in 1794. In 1796 Juel married Marcus Gjøe Rosenkrantz, later member of the Parliament of Norway and Government Minister. She had no children. Her heirs included her niece, Gjertrud Maren Juel who was married to Lars Ingier. In several Norwegian cities, there are streets named after her.

References

Related Reading
Schulerud,  Mentz  (1974) Hafslund gods: Fra Otte Bildt til M. G. Rosenkrantz   (Oslo: Aschehoug)

External links
Borregaard hovedgård
Hafslund Hovedgården i Sarpsborg
Hvitebjørn gård
Losby Bruk
Stubljan herregård

1749 births
1815 deaths
Businesspeople from Oslo
Juel family
Norwegian landowners
18th-century Norwegian businesspeople
18th-century women landowners